The 2004–05 Sri Lankan cricket season featured two Test series with Sri Lanka playing against South Africa and West Indies.

Honours
 Premier Trophy – Colts Cricket Club
 Premier Limited Overs Tournament – cancelled
 Most runs – S Kalavitigoda 885 @ 49.16 (HS 152)
 Most wickets – S Weerakoon 52 @ 20.80 (BB 7-81)

Test series
Sri Lanka won the Test series against South Africa 1–0 with 1 match drawn:
 1st Test @ Galle International Stadium – match drawn
 2nd Test @ Sinhalese Sports Club Ground, Colombo – Sri Lanka won by 313 runs

Sri Lanka won both matches in the two-Test series against West Indies:
 1st Test @ Sinhalese Sports Club Ground, Colombo – Sri Lanka by 6 wickets
 2nd Test @ Asgiriya Stadium, Kandy – Sri Lanka by 240 runs

References

External sources
  CricInfo – brief history of Sri Lankan cricket
 CricketArchive – Tournaments in Sri Lanka

Further reading
 Wisden Cricketers' Almanack 2006

Sri Lankan cricket seasons from 2000–01